The 2006 Women's Junior European Volleyball Championship was the 20th edition of the competition, with the main phase (contested between 12 teams) held in France from 22 August to 30 September 2006.

Qualification

Venues

Preliminary round

Pool I

|}

|}

Pool II

|}

|}

5th–8th classification

5th–8th semifinals

|}

7th place match

|}

5th place match

|}

Final round

Semifinals

|}

3rd place match

|}

Final

|}

Final standing

Awards
Most Valuable Player
  Nataliya Goncharova 
Best Scorer
  Natalia Dianskaya 
Best Server
  Lucia Bosetti 
Best Blocker
  Federica Stufi 
Best Setter
  Manuela Di Crescenzo 
Best Libero
  Paola Došen 
Best Receiver
  Matea Ikić

References

Women's Junior European Volleyball Championship
Europe
Volley
Volley
International volleyball competitions hosted by France